The 1946–47 NHL season was the 30th season of the National Hockey League. The Toronto Maple Leafs defeated the Montreal Canadiens in the 1947 Stanley Cup Final to win their sixth Stanley Cup championship.

League business
The NHL sought to renegotiate the existing professional-amateur agreement with the Canadian Amateur Hockey Association (CAHA) in May 1946. The NHL proposed a flat payment of C$20,000 to cover all amateur players being signed to professional contracts, whereas the CAHA requested $2,000 for any player remaining in the NHL for more than a year. The flat rate offer was later accepted with the stipulation that a junior-aged player could sign a contract at age 16, but not play professional until age 18.

Tommy Gorman, who had been associated with the National Hockey League since its inception
in 1917, announced his retirement in July 1946 as general manager of the Montreal Canadiens. He left behind him seven Stanley Cup champions and a hall of fame career as a coach and general manager. Frank Selke, released from the Toronto Maple Leafs, took over as general manager and would build the greatest dynasty hockey ever knew in the late 1950s. The Canadiens were in financial trouble at this time, despite their winning team and Selke would turn things around by buying up talent and keeping the cream of the crop, selling some players to teams that needed talent.

In December 1946, Selke proposed for professional teams to sponsor junior ice hockey teams under CAHA jurisdiction. The plan spread out talent instead of concentrating it on a few teams, provided a farm system for the NHL.

Red Dutton finally got to resign as president of the NHL, as Clarence Campbell, whom Frank Calder had been grooming as his successor, had come home from Europe. Campbell's experience in law and in hockey made him an ideal choice as president. Campbell hired Ken McKenzie, who would become the league's first publicity director, in September 1946, as his first hiring. McKenzie would go on to found The Hockey News and other publications, including the annual NHL Guide.

Lorne Chabot, whose outstanding career as goalkeeper brought him two Stanley Cups, a Vezina Trophy and a first all-star selection, died October 10, five days after his 46th birthday. He had been suffering from kidney disease for some time and had been bedridden with severe arthritis.

Changes
The league extended the season from 50 games to 60 games. Linesmen are to be hired for each game from neutral cities. The system of hand gestures to symbolize penalties, devised by Bill Chadwick, is adopted officially by the NHL. The NHL announces that winners of its trophies, and members of the All-Star team will each receive $1,000. Additionally, the league modified the captaincy rule so that captains wore the letter "C" and assistant captains wear the letter "A" on the front of their jerseys.

Regular season
Detroit lost Syd Howe through retirement, but another Howe started his great career as Gordie Howe was Detroit's new rookie. In one of his first fights, he took care of Montreal's Rocket Richard. Sid Abel then added a taunt that enraged Richard and he broke Abel's nose in three places.

Chicago decided to purchase goaltender Paul Bibeault from Montreal and regretted it. He played badly, one of his losses being an 11–0 whitewashing at the hands of Toronto. Finally, president and general manager Bill Tobin had enough and brought up 20-year-old Emile Francis to replace him. He made his debut on February 9, 1947, in a 6–4 win over Boston. During the season, Maple Leaf Gardens was the first arena in the NHL to have Plexiglas inserted in the end zones of the rink.

A donnybrook took place March 16, 1947, between the New York Rangers and Montreal Canadiens. Cal Gardner lifted Kenny Reardon's stick so that it clipped him in the mouth and a fight broke out between both teams and the fans. On that same night, Billy Taylor of Detroit set an NHL record with 7 assists in a 10–6 shootout win over the Chicago Black Hawks.

Bill Durnan broke George Hainsworth's record of consecutive Vezina Trophies as he won his fourth in a row, and Montreal again finished first. Max Bentley edged out Rocket Richard by one point and won the scoring championship. On February 12, 1947, Dit Clapper played his final game with the Boston Bruins. Before the start of the game, Clapper was inducted into the Hockey Hall of Fame. He was the only active player to be inducted into the Hall. The New York Rangers were the first NHL team to have their home games televised.

Final standings

Playoffs

Playoff bracket

Semifinals

(1) Montreal Canadiens vs. (3) Boston Bruins

(2) Toronto Maple Leafs vs. (4) Detroit Red Wings

Stanley Cup Finals

Awards

Player statistics

Scoring leaders
Note: GP = Games played, G = Goals, A = Assists, PTS = Points, PIM = Penalties in minutes

Source: NHL

Leading goaltenders

Note: GP = Games played; Mins – Minutes played; GA = Goals against; GAA = Goals against average; W = Wins; L = Losses; T = Ties; SO = Shutouts

Coaches
Boston Bruins: Dit Clapper
Chicago Black Hawks: Johnny Gottselig
Detroit Red Wings: Jack Adams
Montreal Canadiens: Dick Irvin
New York Rangers: Frank Boucher
Toronto Maple Leafs: Hap Day

Debuts
The following is a list of players of note who played their first NHL game in 1946–47 (listed with their first team, asterisk(*) marks debut in playoffs):
Johnny Peirson, Boston Bruins
Pentti Lund*, Boston Bruins
Bill Gadsby, Chicago Black Hawks
Gordie Howe, Detroit Red Wings
Jim McFadden*, Detroit Red Wings
Bill Barilko, Toronto Maple Leafs
Garth Boesch, Toronto Maple Leafs
Gus Mortson, Toronto Maple Leafs
Howie Meeker, Toronto Maple Leafs
Sid Smith, Toronto Maple Leafs

Last games
The following is a list of players of note that played their last game in the NHL in 1946–47 (listed with their last team):
Don Grosso, Boston Bruins
Bill Cowley, Boston Bruins (Last active St. Louis Eagles player)
Dit Clapper, Boston Bruins
Babe Pratt, Boston Bruins
Clint Smith, Chicago Black Hawks
Johnny Mowers, Chicago Black Hawks
Joe Benoit, Montreal Canadiens

See also 
 1946-47 NHL transactions
 List of Stanley Cup champions
 1946 in sports
 1947 in sports

References 
 
 
 
 
 
 
 

Notes

External links
 Hockey Database
 NHL.com

 
1
1